Beltsy is a rural locality (a village) in Kiprevskoye Rural Settlement, Kirzhachsky District, Vladimir Oblast, Russia. The population was 13 as of 2010. There is 1 street.

Geography 
Beltsy is located on the Vakhchilka River, 19 km northeast of Kirzhach (the district's administrative centre) by road. Zherdevo is the nearest rural locality.

History
In the 19th - early 20th centuries, the village was part of the Zherdevsky volost of the Pokrovsky district ,

References 

Rural localities in Kirzhachsky District